Futari no Natsu Monogatari - Never Ending Summer (Japanese: ふたりの夏物語 Never Ending Summer, English: "Summer Story for Two of Us - Never Ending Summer"), also known as Futari no Natsu Monogatari, is the fifth single by Kiyotaka Sugiyama & Omega Tribe, released by VAP on March 6, 1985.

Background 
The single, which became the band's highest charting single, was completed in three days, according to Tetsuji Hayashi. At that time, Hayashi was busy with the work of producing music for all artists, but the tie-up of Omega Tribe's Japan Airlines TV-CM was decided, and it was a situation where he could not complete the composition one day early. After that, a person  Hayashi knew gave him the advertising slogan, "Only you, kimi ni sasayaku, futari no natsu monogatari!" (Japanese: Only you 君にささやくふたりの夏物語; translation: "Only you, whisper to you, two summer stories"). Hayashi started to write the song alongside Chinfa Kan, and it was completed in three days.

When the song was completed in this way, the members, who were on a national tour at the time, returned to Tokyo in between the tour to complete the recording. Hayashi said on his own website, "I don't know because the song I finished in just three days became Omega's biggest hit." In addition, Kiyotaka Sugiyama said, "When we were in a rush to make the song, we flew from Kyushu from Tokyo in the airplane while remembering the lyrics."

Chart performance 
The single was the band's biggest hit, selling 380,000 copies and peaking at the #5 position on the Oricon charts. The song was featured on The Best Ten and on The Top Ten, but since the band had disbanded at the end of 1985, the song did not appear in the program at the end of the year.

Soundtrack appearances 
The song was used as Japan Airlines's JALPAK '85 image song.
The song was included in the album Another Summer, but was remixed in the album. Another remix was included in the greatest hits album Omega Tribe Groove by Eiji Uchinuma and Mizuo Miura.
On July 13, 1985, Fuji TV broadcast Live Aid, and showed off the song.
On June 18, 2014 , this song was ranked 10th in the "popular love song chosen by people over 50" in the Nippon TV program, 1番ソングSHOW.

Track listing

Single

Charts

Weekly charts

Year-end charts

Cover versions

Joey McCoy version 
In 1991, American singer Joey McCoy, previously a backing singer and vocalist of Carlos Toshiki & Omega Tribe, covered the song in English on his album Summer Time Memories.

References 

1985 singles
Omega Tribe (Japanese band) songs
Songs with lyrics by Chinfa Kan
1985 songs
Songs written by Tetsuji Hayashi